Réservoir des Laquets is a lake in Pyrénées, Hautes-Pyrénées, France.

Laquets